Milroy may refer to:

People
Andrea Milroy, Miss World Venezuela 2004
Bobby Milroy (born 1978), Canadian badminton player and former president of the World Badminton Player's Federation
Duncan Milroy  (born 1983), Canadian NHL hockey player
Jack Milroy (born 1915), Scottish comedian
Lesley Milroy (born 1944), British sociolinguist
Nick Milroy (born 1974), American politician
Robert H. Milroy (1816–1890), Union Army general in the American Civil War
Seán Milroy (c. 1877–1946), Irish revolutionary and politician
Thomas Hugh Milroy LLD FRSE (1869–1950), Scottish physiologist and academic

Places

United States
 Milroy, Illinois, in Oquawka Township, Henderson County, Illinois
 Milroy, Indiana
 Milroy Township, Jasper County, Indiana
 Milroy, Minnesota
 Milroy, an unincorporated community in McHenry County, North Dakota
 Milroy, Pennsylvania
 Milroy Township, Jasper County, Indiana
 Milroy Township, in Grant County, West Virginia
 Fort Milroy, in Randolph County, West Virginia

Australia
 Milroy, New South Wales

Other
 A horse in the American Civil War

See also